Swagg is the third studio album by Russian rapper Timati, released on June 8, 2012.

Track listing

European 2CD-Set Edition

Charts

References
Official Web Site
Black Star inc. Producing center Official Site

2012 albums
Timati albums